Ussuriysk Astrophysical Observatory is an observatory near Ussuriysk, Russia. It is operated by the Far Eastern Branch of the Russian Academy of Sciences. Regular observations have been carried out in the observatory since 1954.

References

External links 
  

Astronomical observatories in Russia
Astronomical observatories built in the Soviet Union